Tyler Junior College (TJC) is a public community college in Tyler, Texas. It is one of the largest community colleges in the state, with an enrollment of more than 12,000 credit students and an additional 20,000 continuing education enrollments annually. Its West campus includes continuing education and workforce training programs and TJC North in Lindale, Texas offers general education classes, nursing programs, and the veterinary technician associate of applied science. The college also operates locations in Jacksonville and Rusk. TJC offers Associate of Science, Associate of Applied Science and Associate of Arts, specialized  baccalaureate degrees, and certificate programs.

History
The college operated as part of the Tyler public school system from its inception in 1926 until 1945, when voters supported the creation of an independent Tyler Junior College District. The junior college district now includes the Tyler, Chapel Hill, Grand Saline, Lindale, Van, and Winona school districts.

Campus

The independently operated Tyler Museum of Art is located on the school's main campus. The Earth and Space Science Center has a planetarium and exhibit hall offering public shows in its -diameter domed theater every day except Mondays, and sponsors a monthly astronomy lecture series. Additionally, Wagstaff Gymnasium is home to the TJC Apache volleyball and basketball teams.

Co-ed residence halls include Louise H. & Joseph Z. Ornelas Residential Complex, Crossroads, and Bateman Hall. Vaughn Hall houses women and Holley Hall is for men. Claridge Hall is co-ed for athletes. Sledge Hall houses members of female athletic teams, and Hudnall Hall houses members of the football team.

Athletics
The school competes in the National Junior College Athletic Association's Region XIV with soccer, football, basketball, baseball, tennis, and golf teams (men) and softball, volleyball, soccer, basketball, tennis, and golf teams (women). The College has won 68 national junior college championships.  Since 2000, championships include: women's basketball in 2000 and 2022; men's baseball in 2007, 2014, 2015, 2016, 2017 and 2021; men's golf in 2003 and 2008; men's soccer in 2009, 2010, 2012, 2014, 2016 and 2017; women's soccer in 2009, 2011, 2017, 2019 and 2021; men's tennis in 2002, 2003, 2004, 2010, 2013, 2018, 2019 and 2021; and women's tennis in 2000, 2001, 2002, 2005, 2010, 2011, 2012, 2013, 2017, 2018, 2021 and 2022.

Notable alumni
Derick Armstrong, professional football player
Mitch Berger, professional football player
Jimmy Butler, professional basketball player
Quincy Butler, professional football player
Earl Dotson, professional football player
Dom Dwyer, professional soccer player
Robert Ferguson, former college coach
Daniel E. Garcia, Bishop of the Diocese of Monterey
John Harvey - professional football player
Bill Herchman, professional football player
Bryan Hughes, Republican member of the Texas State Senate from Wood County since 2017 and previous member of the Texas House of Representatives
Will Jennings, Songwriter; Grammy, Golden Globe and Academy Award winner
Bill Johnson, professional football player
Johnny Knox, professional football player
Bill C. Malone, American musician, author and historian specializing in country music
Charles R. Moore (minister), Methodist minister and civil rights advocate
Ali Musse, professional soccer player
Robert Pack, professional basketball player and coach
Chuck Quilter, professional football player
Josh Reynolds, professional football player
Shaquille Murray-Lawrence, professional football player and bobsledder
Dominic Rhodes, professional football player
Craig Tiley, CEO of Tennis Australia and Director of the Australian Open
Byron M. Tunnell, Texas politician
Chris Tomlin, Christian Singer, Songwriter, Worship leader, Dove and Grammy Award winner
Jared Wells, professional baseball player
Shea Whigham, actor
Karl Williams, professional football player

References

External links 

 Official website
 Official athletics website
 

 
Education in Tyler, Texas
Universities and colleges accredited by the Southern Association of Colleges and Schools
Community colleges in Texas
Education in Smith County, Texas
Tourist attractions in Smith County, Texas
Education in Cherokee County, Texas
Buildings and structures in Tyler, Texas
NJCAA athletics